Sulo Artur Salmi (4 March 1914 in Vaasa – 29 April 1984 in Vaasa) was a Finnish gymnast who competed in the 1948 Summer Olympics.

References

1914 births
1984 deaths
Finnish male artistic gymnasts
Olympic gymnasts of Finland
Gymnasts at the 1948 Summer Olympics
Olympic gold medalists for Finland
Olympic medalists in gymnastics
Medalists at the 1948 Summer Olympics
Sportspeople from Vaasa
20th-century Finnish people